Louis C. Boyle (February 26, 1866 – July 14, 1925) was a lawyer and politician from Kansas and Missouri. He served as Kansas Attorney General from 1897 to 1899.

Early life and education
Louis C. Boyle was born on February 26, 1866, in Port Colborne. At the age of eight, his family moved to Watford. He was educated in Watford before moving to Colorado at the age of fifteen to work in the mines. He studied at University of Michigan Law School in Ann Arbor, Michigan, and graduated with a degree in law in 1889. He was then admitted to the bar in Michigan.

Career
After graduating, Boyle moved to Fort Scott, Kansas. Boyle was a Democrat. He was elected as prosecuting attorney of Bourbon County, Kansas. He served in that role for four years. He then returned to practicing law. 

In 1896, Boyle was elected as Kansas Attorney General. He remained in the role until 1899 on a Democratic–Populist ticket.

In 1899, Boyle moved to Kansas City, Missouri. In 1903, Boyle formed a law firm with W. F. Guthrie in Fort Scott.

He also worked in Washington, D.C., for a time, supporting the legislative and legal matters for different lumber associations. In May 1923, Boyle formed the Reed, Boyle & Holmes law firm with Senator James A. Reed and Massey Holmes. It was later renamed Reed, Boyle, Holmes & Taylor and Boyle remained with the firm until his death.

Personal life
Boyle married Gertrude Burson, of Garnett, Kansas, in 1890. They had three children, George, Katherine and Clara Louise.

Boyle died on July 14, 1925, at the Mayo Clinic in Rochester, Minnesota, after an operation to remove a goiter and an operation of the abdomen. He was buried at Forest Hill Calvary Cemetery in Kansas City.

References

External links

1866 births
1925 deaths
19th-century American lawyers
19th-century American politicians
20th-century American lawyers
20th-century American politicians
 American company founders
Burials in Missouri
Canadian emigrants to the United States
Kansas Attorneys General
Kansas Democrats
Kansas Populists
Law firm founders
Lawyers from Kansas City, Missouri
Lawyers from Washington, D.C.
People from Colorado
People from Fort Scott, Kansas
People from Lambton County
People from Port Colborne
Politicians from Kansas City, Missouri
Politicians from Washington, D.C.
University of Michigan Law School alumni